Frigocanthus is a genus of extinct tetraodontiform marine fishes.

Species
 Frigocanthus margaritatus
 Frigocanthus stroppanobili

Fossil record
Fossils of Frigocanthus are found in the Pliocene and Pleistocene of Italy and in the Pliocene of Greece.

Description
The filefishes of the genus Frigocanthus have 21 vertebrae and show a remarkable enlargement of scales. Furthermore, they have a strong first dorsal spine with large, prominent barbs.

Bibliography
Sorbini, C. & Tyler, J.C. (2004) Review of the fossil file fishes of the family Monacanthidae (Tetraodontiformes), Pliocene and Pleistocene of Europe, with a new genus, Frigocanthus, and two new species related to the Recent Aluterus. Bollettino del Museo Civico di Storia Naturale di Verona, 28, 41–76. Geologia Paleontologia Preistoria

References